The Aggravated Vehicle-Taking Act 1992 is an Act of the Parliament of the United Kingdom.  It amends the Theft Act 1968 by creating the specific offence of aggravated vehicle-taking, which combines the taking of a vehicle without the owner's consent with driving it dangerously, causing injury, or causing damage to the vehicle or other property.  It carries a mandatory disqualification from driving.

The Act was brought in to tackle the problem of joyriding, which was at the time a widespread problem in the UK.  It was subject to a fast-track passage through Parliament.

References

Acts of the Parliament of the United Kingdom concerning England and Wales
English criminal law
United Kingdom Acts of Parliament 1992